The 2019 WPL Rugby Season was the eleventh season of the Women's Premier League Rugby. Life West Gladiatrix made their WPL debut and joined the West Conference and Chicago North Shore Rugby moved to the East Conference.

Season Standings 
Final standings after the regular season:

Eastern Conference

Western Conference

Regular season

Week 1

Week 2

Week 3

Week 4

Week 5

Week 6

Week 7

Week 8

Week 9

Week 10

Playoffs

Bowl Competition

9th Place Final

7th Place Final

5th Place Final

Cup Competition

Semifinals

3rd Place Final

Grand Final

See also
Major League Rugby
United States women's national rugby sevens team
United States women's national rugby union team

References

External links
 USA Rugby Women's Premier League official site

Women's Premier League
Women's Premier League